Willcock and similar can mean:
Alex Willcock, the Founder and CEO of Imagini the owner of VisualDNA technology 
Amy Willcock, an American -born British-based cookery book writer, who having specialised in cooking on the AGA cooker
Chris Willcock, Christopher Willcock (born 1947) is an Australian Jesuit priest
Eric Willcock (born 28 September 1947), a former English cricketer
Harry Willcock (23 January 1896 - 12 December 1952), a member of the Liberal Party, was the last person to be prosecuted for refusing to produce an Identity Card
John Willcock, John Collings Willcock (9 August 1879–7 June 1956) was the 15th Premier of Western Australia
Kevin Willcock, Kevin James Willcock (born 8 March 1973), a former English cricketer

See also
Wilcock
Wilcox (disambiguation)
Wilcox (surname)
Willcocks
Willcox (disambiguation)
Willcox (surname)
Willock
Wilcoxon

Patronymic surnames
English-language surnames